Sakhakkale Munnoottu is a 1977 Indian Malayalam-language film, directed by J. Sasikumar and produced by T. K. Balachandran. The film stars Prem Nazir, KPAC Lalitha, Thikkurissy Sukumaran Nair and Jose Prakash. The film has musical score by G. Devarajan.

Cast
Prem Nazir
KPAC Lalitha
Thikkurissy Sukumaran Nair
Jose Prakash
Sankaradi
Sreelatha Namboothiri
Sumithra
T. K. Balachandran
Vidhubala

Soundtrack
The music was composed by G. Devarajan and the lyrics were written by Mankombu Gopalakrishnan.

References

External links
 

1977 films
1970s Malayalam-language films